Jack Cady (March 20, 1932 – January 14, 2004) was an American author, born in Kentucky. He is known mostly as an award winning writer of fantasy, horror, and science fiction. He won the Nebula Award, the World Fantasy Award, and the Bram Stoker Award.

Cady was a conscientious objector during the Korean War, but served in the U.S. Coast Guard in Maine. He later had several jobs, including truck driver, auctioneer, landscaper and finally university instructor. He first taught creative writing at the University of Washington from 1968 until 1973, and he then had a number of brief teaching stints at colleges in Illinois, Pennsylvania and Alaska from 1973 to 1978. During 1985 he began teaching writing at Pacific Lutheran University in Tacoma, Washington, and he retired from that job in 1998. Cady married fellow writer Carol Orlock in 1977, and they remained married until his death. Cady's collected literary papers were donated to the Mortvedt Library at Pacific Lutheran University during the spring of 2006.

Cady is perhaps known best for the Nebula-winning short story "The Night We Buried Road Dog" (1993). Stories of his were included in the Best American Short Stories anthologies of 1971 and 1972.

His dystopian novel McDowell's Ghost concerns a modern-day Southerner who keeps seeing the ghost of an ancestor killed during the Civil War; the spirit helps McDowell obtain justice for a female friend who was raped. 

Another of Cady's books was The American Writer: Shaping a Nation's Mind, a survey of American literature.

Bibliography

Novels 
 The Well (1981)
 Singleton (1981)
 The Jonah Watch (1982)
 Mc Dowell's Ghost (1982)
 The Man Who Could Make Things Vanish (1983)
 Inagehi (1993)
 Street (1994)
 The Off Season (1995)
 The Hauntings of Hood Canal (2001)
 Rules of '48 (2009)
 

Under the pseudonym Pat Franklin:
 "Dark Dreaming" (1991)
 "Embrace of the Wolf" (1993)

Short fiction 
Collections
 The Burning and Other Stories (1972)
 Tattoo (1978)
 The Sons of Noah (1992) (World Fantasy Award winner)
 The Night We Buried Road Dog (1998)
 Ghostland (2001; e-publication)
 Ghosts of Yesterday (2003)

Stories

Non-fiction 
 The American Writer (1999)

See also
List of horror fiction authors

References

External links

Obit from SFWA

1932 births
2004 deaths
20th-century American male writers
20th-century American novelists
20th-century American short story writers
21st-century American male writers
21st-century American novelists
21st-century American short story writers
American conscientious objectors
American fantasy writers
American horror writers
American male novelists
American male short story writers
American science fiction writers
The Magazine of Fantasy & Science Fiction people
Nebula Award winners
Novelists from Washington (state)
Pacific Lutheran University faculty
World Fantasy Award-winning writers